Yair Ziv is an Israeli footballer who plays for Maccabi Netanya. His older brother Yoav Ziv is a former footballer.

External links
 

1994 births
Israeli Jews
Living people
Israeli footballers
Maccabi Netanya F.C. players
Hapoel Herzliya F.C. players
Maccabi Daliyat al-Karmel F.C. players
Liga Leumit players
Footballers from Hadera
Association football defenders
Association football midfielders